Choqa Balk-e Mohammad Zaman (also Romanized as Choqā Balk-e Moḩammad Zamān, Cheqā Balak-e Moḩammad Zamān, and Cheqā Balak Moḩammad Zamān, Cheqā Balak-e Moḩammad Zamān Khān, Cheqā Balak Moḩammad Zamān Khān, Cheqā Balek-e Moḩammad, and Chia Balek Zamān Khān) is a village in Mahidasht Rural District, Mahidasht District, Kermanshah County, Kermanshah Province, Iran. At the 2006 census, its population was 117, in 25 families.

References 

Populated places in Kermanshah County